Ó hAodha is a Gaelic-Irish surname, that has commonly been Anglicised to Hayes or Hughes.

Overview

Now generally anglicised as O'Hea (in County Cork), Hughes or Hayes, Ó hAodha derives from Aodh, a personal name (meaning "fire") popular at all historical times throughout the Gaelic world.

It is the surname of at least ten unrelated families found in Gaelic Ireland, such as

 Ó hAodha of Muscraighe-Luachra/the Múscraige of Sliabh Luachra, now County Cork;
 Ó hAodha of Tír Chonaill (centered at Ballyshannon, County Donegal);
 Ó hAodha of Tír Eoghain (around Ardstraw, County Tyrone;
 Ó hAodha of Ulaid (around what is now Tynan, County Armagh;
 Ó hAodha of Airgíalla (centred on what is now Farney, County Monaghan;
 Ó hAodha of Dál Fiatach in Ulaid (now south County Down;
 Ó hAodha of Muintir Murchada in what is now County Galway.

Bearers of the name

 Flann Ua Aedha, Abbot of Aran, died 1110.
 Séamas Ó hAodha, member of the Gaelic League, fl. 1914 - 1922.

External links
 http://www.irishtimes.com/ancestor/surname/index.cfm?fuseaction=Go.&UserID=
 http://www.failteromhat.com/pedigree.php

Surnames
Irish families
Surnames of Irish origin
Irish-language surnames
Families of Irish ancestry